United States v. Pohlot, 827 F.2d 889 (3d Cir. 1987), is a criminal case that summarized diverse uses of the expression "diminished capacity".

References

External links

1987 in United States case law
United States Court of Appeals for the Third Circuit cases